Ravenscraig Hospital was a mental health facility in Inverkip Road, Greenock, Scotland. It was managed by NHS Greater Glasgow and Clyde.

History
The foundation stone for the facility was laid by Earl of Mar and Kellie in September 1876. The facility was opened as the Smithston Asylum in March 1879. It served as a military hospital for wounded soldiers in the First World war and as a naval hospital for Canadian sailors during the Second World War. It joined the National Health Service as Ravenscraig Hospital in 1948 and two new 120-bedded units known as Corlic and Dunrod were built to the north of the main building in the 1960s. The original building closed in December 2005 and the remainder of the facilities closed in 2014.

The site was subsequently sold to a residential developer for a nominal sum; however in March 2019 toxic chemical contamination was found on the site giving rise to concerns about the development.

See also
 List of listed buildings in Inverkip, Inverclyde

References

Hospitals in Inverclyde
1879 establishments in Scotland
Hospitals established in 1879
Hospital buildings completed in 1879
Defunct hospitals in Scotland
Former psychiatric hospitals in Scotland
Listed hospital buildings in Scotland
Category B listed buildings in Inverclyde
Buildings and structures in Greenock